Alfred Lagache (24 October 1889 – 18 August 1971) was a French professional three-cushion billiards player.

Career 
A number of players from France have won world championships in different disciplines of carom billiards, but Lagache has been the only Frenchman to ever win the UMB World Three-cushion Championship, taking the title in 1935 and again in 1937. Lagache would also finish third the following season, in 1938.

He also won the CEB European Three-cushion Championship in 1935, 1939, 1947 and 1949. Lagache would also finish third the following season

References

 

French carom billiards players
Place of birth missing
Place of death missing
World champions in three-cushion billiards
1889 births
1971 deaths